The National Club is a private club and civil association based in the Plaza San Martín of the Historic Centre of Lima. Founded on October 19, 1855, it has been the meeting place for the Peruvian aristocracy throughout the 19th and 20th centuries, as its members are members of the most distinguished and wealthy families in the country.

Of its kind, it has been considered one of the ten best and most elegant clubs in the world for its facilities, bibliographic heritage and services.

History
The National Club was founded by 81 partners, young members of the most prominent families from Lima, on October 19, 1855. The institution was established based on the English gentlemen's clubs that were founded during the 18th century in London, mainly in the St James's neighborhood known as Clubland, and grew in popularity throughout Europe during the 19th century. These social centers were frequented by its first president Gaspar de la Puente y Remírez de Laredo, who came from one of the prominent families of the colonial aristocracy.

Its first institutional premises were located in some apartments on the upper floors of the Hotel del Universo on the corner of the Portal de San Agustín with Lártiga St., whose owner was the French citizen Estanislao Courtheoux, located in the Plazuela del Teatro where the Segura Theater is located. within the historic center of Lima.

From that location, the institution moved in 1859 to settle in a residence on Valladolid street, owned by José Herce y Santiago. In 1865, it was moved to the next block, occupying the upper floors of the former ancestral home of the counts of Fuente González and Villar de Fuente, which was later owned by the Ortiz de Villate family, known today as Casa Barbieri, located on the corner of Piedra and La Palma streets.

Then, in 1869, the institution moved to its fourth location, installed at the corner of the Portal de Botoneros and Mercaderes St. in the Plaza de Armas, where the  would later be located. In this place, the members of the club were eyewitnesses of the Gutiérrez brothers' attempted coup d'état in 1872 and after the events of the War of the Pacific and the Chilean occupation of Lima. Later, between 1891 and 1895, the institution settled in its fifth location on the upper floors of the current  on Espaderos St. in Jirón de la Unión, owned by the Ramírez de Arellano y Baquíjano Estate and where it had previously inhabited until his death in 1842 the hero of independence Bernardo O'Higgins. The club briefly hosted the members of the Club de la Unión in this location, after the troops of General Andrés Avelino Cáceres assaulted and looted the headquarters of that institution during the events of the Peruvian civil war of 1894-1895.

In 1895, the club was located in a small palace on Núñez street, owned by Mr. Ernesto Puccio, located within the Cercado de Lima. The move to this location meant a period of consolidation for the club, which materialized in the use of a complete lot for the first time. Finally, in 1929, it was established in its permanent location in front of the Plaza San Martín, on the foundations of a house that belonged to Guillermo Talleri and that had formerly belonged to the Silva Santisteban family.

Distinguished characters from Peruvian republican life have belonged to the National Club, including seventeen presidents of the Republic and notable figures who took part in the historic events of May 2, 1866, in the naval campaign of 1879, in the trenches of San Juan and Miraflores, and in the battle of Huamachuco. Likewise, the club was the main meeting place for the twenty-four friends, an oligarchy group belonging to the Civilista Party that led the country during a historical period known as the Aristocratic Republic.

Headquarters

The current premises of the club were built next to the Teatro Colón and on the site of a small square called the Plaza de la Micheo located between the old streets of Belén and Iturrizaga, whose land today forms part of Plaza San Martín, one of the main squares of the historic centre of Lima inaugurated by President Augusto B. Leguía in 1921 during the celebrations for the Centennial of the Independence of Peru.

The design and plans were entrusted to the Polish architect Ricardo de Jaxa Malachowski and the engineer Enrique Bianchi. In the first stage of construction of the building, the New York-based firm The Foundation Company intervened and later the administration of the work was assumed directly by the architect Malachowski, which was completed in 1929. The engineer Bianchi, one of the promoters of the project, passed away before seeing it finished.

The French academic-style building is currently located in front of Plaza San Martín, on the west side at the corner of the Portal de Zela with the Jirón de la Unión. Due to its architectural value, it has been declared a historical monument as part of the Cultural Heritage of the Nation.

In front of this place, the director of the newspaper El Comercio, was murdered in 1935 together with his wife María Laos Argüelles by a young Aprista, when they were both walking from the Hotel Bolívar to have lunch at the club.

List of presidents
The following list details the members who have held the presidency of the club since its founding in 1855:

See also
History of Peru (1895–1919), a period known as the Aristocratic Republic in Peruvian historiography.
Historic Centre of Lima
Plaza San Martín, Lima

References

Clubs and societies in Peru
Buildings and structures in Lima